Niels-Henning Ørsted Pedersen (27 May 1946 – 19 April 2005), also known by his abbreviated nickname NHØP, was a Danish jazz double bassist.

Biography

Pedersen was born in Osted, near Roskilde, on the Danish island of Zealand, the son of a church organist. As a child, Ørsted Pedersen played piano, but from the age of 13, he started learning to play upright bass and at the age of 14, while studying, he began his professional jazz career in Denmark with his first band, Jazzkvintet 60 (Danish for Jazz Quintet 60). By the age of fifteen, he had the ability to accompany leading musicians at nightclubs, working regularly at Copenhagen's Jazzhus Montmartre, after his debut there on New Year's Eve 1961, when he was only 15. When seventeen, he had already turned down an offer to join the Count Basie orchestra, mainly because he was too young to get legal permission to live and work as a musician in the United States.

The Montmartre was a regular stop-off for touring American Jazz stars, and as a member of the house band, the young Ørsted Pedersen performed with saxophonists such as Sonny Rollins, Dexter Gordon, Rahsaan Roland Kirk and Stan Getz, and pianist Bill Evans, with whom he toured in Europe in 1965. During the 1960s, Pedersen played with a series of other important American jazzmen who were touring or resident in Denmark, including Ben Webster, Brew Moore, Bud Powell, Count Basie, Roy Eldridge, Dizzy Gillespie, Jackie McLean, and vocalist Ella Fitzgerald.  

He is perhaps best known for his extensive collaboration with Oscar Peterson from 1972 to 1987. His predecessor, Ray Brown, thought highly of the Dane and regarded him as the only upright bassist equal to the task of keeping up with the pianist. He was awarded Best Bass Player of the Year by DownBeat Critics' Poll in 1981.

Ørsted Pedersen worked in duo and trio arrangements with pianist Kenny Drew, recording over 50 albums together. He also worked with Stéphane Grappelli and Joe Pass and recorded extensively as a leader. His best known songs are "My Little Anna", "Jaywalkin'", and "The Puzzle", as well as jazz arrangements of traditional Danish folk songs. A duo performance with Rune Gustafsson at Vossajazz 1980, concluded on the album Just The Way You Are on the label Sonet Gramofon, recorded half a year after this first meeting. He was awarded the Nordic Council Music Prize in 1991. 

Pedersen had a particular ability to interpret Danish songs and folk melodies. He often played within trio ensembles, partly collectively with the trumpeter Palle Mikkelborg and the keyboard player Kenneth Knudsen, and partly under his own name, usually with guitarists like Philip Catherine and Ulf Wakenius. In 1999, he co-led a duo with pianist Mulgrew Miller, touring Europe, Japan, Australia, and Korea. This format was later enlarged into a trio featuring drummer Alvin Queen. This trio remained intact until Pedersen's death.

Death 

Ørsted Pedersen died of heart failure in 2005 at the age of 58 in Copenhagen, Denmark. He was survived by his wife, Solveig, and his three children.
Oscar Peterson wrote:

Awards and honors 
1974: Grammy Award. Best Jazz Performance by a Group, The Trio - Oscar Peterson, Joe Pass and Niels-Henning Ørsted Pedersen
1981: Best Bass Player of the Year by Downbeat Critics' Poll
1991: Nordic Council Music Prize

Discography

As leader 

 Paul Bley/NHØP with Paul Bley (SteepleChase, 1973)
 Duo with Kenny Drew (SteepleChase, 1973)
 Duo 2 with Kenny Drew (SteepleChase, 1974)
 Two's Company with Joe Albany (SteepleChase, 1974)
 Jaywalkin' (SteepleChase, 1975)
 Duo Live in Concert with Kenny Drew (SteepleChase, 1975)
 Movability with Martial Solal (MPS, 1976)
 Double Bass with Sam Jones (SteepleChase, 1976)
 Pictures with Kenneth Knudsen (SteepleChase, 1977)
 In Concert with Kenny Drew (SteepleChase, 1979)
 Dancing on the Tables (SteepleChase, 1979)
 Goin' Straight with Edgar Wilson (MPS, 1979)
 Tania Maria & Niels Henning Orsted Pedersen (Medley, 1979)
 Four Keys (MPS) with Martial Solal, Lee Konitz, John Scofield (MPS, 1979)
 Chops with Joe Pass (Pablo, 1979)
 Just the Way You Are with Rune Gustafsson (Sonet, 1980)
 Northsea Nights with Joe Pass (Pablo, 1980)
 Looking at Bird with Archie Shepp (SteepleChase, 1981)
 The Viking with Philip Catherine (Pablo, 1983)
 Trinity with Boulou Ferre, Elios Ferre (SteepleChase, 1983)
 Face to Face with Tete Montoliu (SteepleChase, 1984)
 With a Little Help from My Friend(s) with Claes Crona (Skivbolaget, 1985)
 With Joy and Feelings with Ulla Neumann (Four Leaf Clover, 1985)
 The Eternal Traveller (Pablo, 1984)
 Threesome with Monty Alexander, Grady Tate (Soul Note, 1986)
 Heart to Heart with Palle Mikkelborg, Kenneth Knudsen (Storyville, 1986)
 Play with Us with Louis Hjulmand (Olufsen, 1987)
 Duologue with Allan Botschinsky (MA Music, 1987)
 Latin Alley with Alain Jean-Marie (IDA, 1988)
 Copenhagen Groove with Moller/Clausen/Cobb (Stunt, 1989)
 Three for the Road with Guitars Unlimited (Sonet, 1989)
 Homage/Once Upon a Time with Palle Mikkelborg (Sonet, 1990)
 Uncharted Land (Pladecompagniet, 1992)
 Spanish Nights with Philip Catherine (Enja, 1992)
 Art of the Duo with Philip Catherine (Enja, 1993)
 Ambiance with Danish Radio Big Band (Dacapo, 1994)
 Misty Dawn with Doky/Riel (Columbia, 1994)
 Scandinavian Wood (Caprice, 1995)
 Those Who Were (Verve, 1996)
 Elegies Mostly with Dick Hyman (Gemini, 1996)
 Friends Forever featuring Renee Rosnes (Milestone, 1997) – recorded in 1995
 This Is All I Ask (Verve, 1998)
 In the Name of Music with Trio Rococo (BMG, 1998)
 The Duets with Mulgrew Miller (Bang & Olufsen, 1999)
 Breaking the Ice with Floris Nico Bunink (BV Haast, 1999)
 Grundtvigs Sang Til Livet with Ole Kock Hansen (Vartov, 2000)
 The Duo Live! with Mulgrew Miller (Storyville, 2016)

See also 
 List of jazz bassists

Notes

References 

"Scandinavian Wood": The musical career of Niels-Henning Ørsted Pedersen in the light of his discography by Jørgen Mathiasen. Books on Demand 2010. .

External links
Niels-Henning Orsted Pedersen – Danish virtuoso bassist who kept pace with Oscar Peterson by John Fordham, 21 May 2005, at The Guardian
[ Profile and discography] at allmusic.com
Niels-Henning Ørsted Pedersen Autumn Leaves on YouTube
Rick Beato, NHØP - Jaco before Jaco...The GREATEST Bass Player You've NEVER Heard Of on YouTube
Photo of Niels-Henning Ørsted Pedersen's grave at Findagrave

1946 births
2005 deaths
People from Lejre Municipality
20th-century double-bassists
21st-century double-bassists
20th-century bass guitarists
21st-century bass guitarists
Bebop double-bassists
Danish jazz double-bassists
Male double-bassists
Danish jazz bass guitarists
Danish jazz composers
Enja Records artists
Grammy Award winners
Hard bop double-bassists
SteepleChase Records artists
Male bass guitarists
21st-century guitarists
DR Big Band members
Male jazz composers
20th-century Danish male musicians
21st-century male musicians
20th-century jazz composers
Oscar Peterson Trio members